Kyimyindaing Township (also Kyeemyindaing Township, Kyimyindine, or Kyi Myin Dine, and anglicised as Kemmendine) is located in the western part of Yangon, and shares borders with Kamayut Township in the north, the Yangon River and Twante Township in the west, Sanchaung Township in the east, and Ahlon Township in the south. It consists of 21 wards.

Etymology
"Kyimyindaing" derives from the Mon language term "Kamaingdeung", which means "walled town."

Education 
The township has 15 primary schools, three middle schools and five high schools, and is home to the School for the Blind Kyimyindine.

Population 
A population of 111,514 people reside in Kyimyindaing Township with 52.8% being female residents and 47.2% being male residents.

Landmarks
The following is a list of landmarks protected by the city in Kyimyindaing township.

References

Townships of Yangon